Liverpool Shopping Park is an out of town retail park located in Edge Lane, Liverpool, England.

History
Opened in 1991 as Edge Lane Retail Park, it had an MGM cinema, renamed Virgin in 1995, then UGC in 1999 then Cineworld in 2005. Comet, Land of Leather, JJB Sports, Carpet Right and Frankie and Benny's and Fatty Arbuckle's also operated. The site began redevelopment in the mid-2010s and Phase 1 of the new shopping park opened in November 2017.

Stores
Below are just a few of the many stores - as of March 2018 the shopping centre contains: 
Costa Coffee, Next, Boots
A planned 41 retail units are available.

Phase 1
October 2017
M&S Food Hall, Boots, H&M, Superdrug, Smyths Toys, TK Maxx, JD Sports, Foot Asylum, River Island, Regatta and fashion retailer Outfit, whose brands include Topshop, Topman, Miss Selfridge and Dorothy Perkins in selected stores.

Phase 2
Eight more retailers Regatta, Superdrug, The Works and Footasylum/DROME

Phase 3 (2018)
Wilko, Next, Clarks and Greggs followed in early 2018.

All of the new retailers took space in the Western Quarter, the distinctive 'horseshoe' of 17 retail units that front onto Edge Lane. Greggs took a unit close to the park's main entrance, near to Chiquito and Subway.

See also
Liverpool One
New Mersey Retail Park

References

External links
 Official website

Shopping centres in Liverpool
Retail parks in the United Kingdom